Mortimer Leo Downey III (born August 9, 1936) was the U.S. Deputy Secretary of Transportation from 1993 to 2001, making him the longest-serving person to ever hold the post. Downey was originally appointed to the position at the beginning of the Clinton administration, and additionally served as Acting Secretary of Transportation for the first four days of the Bush administration, from January 21, 2001 to January 24, 2001. Prior to his service as Deputy Secretary of Transportation, he was executive director and chief financial officer of the New York Metropolitan Transportation Authority (MTA), where he was instrumental in creating and successfully orchestrating the critically, complex and much needed multi-agency capital plan and subsequent updates.  During the Carter Administration, from 1977 to 1981, Downey served in the Department of Transportation as Assistant Secretary for Budget and Programs.  Prior to that appointment, Downey was the first transportation program analyst for the U.S. House of Representatives Committee on the Budget.  He also held various positions at the Port Authority of New York and New Jersey.

He was on the Obama transition team, and the subject of speculation as a possible Secretary of Transportation in the Obama Administration.

Downey serves on the board of directors of the Washington Metropolitan Area Transit Authority and served as Board Chair from January 2015–January 2016.
An alumnus of Phillips Academy in Andover, Massachusetts, Downey graduated magna cum laude from Yale University in 1958, and received a master's of public administration from New York University in 1966. He served in the U.S. Coast Guard Reserve, attaining the rank of lieutenant commander. Following completion of his service as Deputy Secretary of Transportation in 2001, Downey became a transportation consultant.

Downey is a Fellow of the National Academy of Public Administration.

References

External links

Living people
United States Secretaries of Transportation
Phillips Academy alumni
Yale University alumni
Robert F. Wagner Graduate School of Public Service alumni
Harvard Business School alumni 
1936 births
People from Oakton, Virginia
Politicians from Springfield, Massachusetts
Virginia Democrats
United States Coast Guard officers
Carter administration personnel
Clinton administration personnel
Employees of the United States House of Representatives
United States Deputy Secretaries of Transportation